Luciano Leilua (born 8 June 1996) is a Samoa international rugby league footballer who plays as a  forward for the North Queensland Cowboys in the NRL.

He previously played for the St. George Illawarra Dragons and Wests Tigers in the National Rugby League.

Background
Leilua was born in Camperdown, New South Wales, Australia, and is of Samoan descent. He is the younger brother of former NRL player Joseph Leilua.

Leilua played his junior rugby league for Hurstville United, before being signed by the St. George Illawarra Dragons.

Playing career

Early career
From 2014 to 2016, Leilua played for the St. George Illawarra Dragons' NYC team. On 25 July 2014, he re-signed with the Dragons on a 2-year contract until the end of 2016. In November and December 2014, he played for the Australian Schoolboys.

2016
In Round 22 of the 2016 NRL season, Leilua made his NRL debut for the Dragons against the Brisbane Broncos. In September, he was named at second-row in the 2016 NYC Team of the Year.

2018
Leilua made 16 appearances for St George in the 2018 NRL season as the club reached the finals after finishing 7th on the table.  In week one, Leilua scored a try as St George defeated Brisbane 48-18 in an upset victory at Suncorp Stadium.  The following week, Leilua played in St George's 13-12 elimination final loss against South Sydney.

2019
Leilua made a total of 22 appearances for St George in the 2019 NRL season as the club endured one of their worst ever seasons finishing in 15th place on the table. On 30 November, Leilua signed a three-year deal to join the Wests Tigers.

2020
Leilua made his debut for Wests against St. George Illawarra in round 1 of the 2020 NRL season at WIN Stadium.  Wests went on to win the match 24-14 with Leilua scoring a second half try. He scored his first double in round 10 in a record 48-0 "thrashing" of the Brisbane Broncos.

One of three Tigers players to appear in all 20 of their games, his 7 tries were the third most for the club and the most of any Wests forward, and equal best amongst forwards in the NRL. He attributed his run of performances to the 5 kilos he dropped in the pre-season, saying, "I've just got to take that into the pre-season and make sure I stay in shape … don't gain any daddy weight. Besides not making the finals I feel I've had a pretty good year. Madge has played a big part in my footy this year. He's given me a lot of confidence and belief."

2021
Leilua played a total of 24 matches for the Wests Tigers in the 2021 NRL season as the club finished 13th and missed the finals.

On 24 November, Leilua signed a three-year contract worth $2.2 million to join North Queensland starting in 2023.  On the same day as the announcement, Leilua requested an immediate release from Wests Tigers.

2022
On 14 June, Leilua was granted an early release from his Wests Tigers contract to join the North Queensland side. He said, "I was disappointed when they let go of Madge but me being close to Madge, they wanted to flick me. I did take it hard, it was a bit disappointing. I guess the board and those guys up there wanted me out. I don’t know why."
Leilua played 11 games for North Queensland after his switch from the Wests Tigers including the clubs upset loss to Parramatta in the preliminary final at Queensland Country Bank Stadium.

On 3 October, Leilua was arrested by NSW Police and charged with two counts of assault. NSW police confirmed they were called to a home around 1pm, officers attended and were told Leilua allegedly assaulted a woman known to him and smashed the woman’s phone. The North Queensland club later released a statement which read, "The club is gathering further information and assisting the NRL Integrity Unit as well as providing support to all parties involved, further comment will be made in due course."

In October Leilua was named in the Samoa squad for the 2021 Rugby League World Cup.

References

External links

St. George Illawarra Dragons profile
Dragons profile
NRL profile

1996 births
Living people
Australian rugby league players
Australian sportspeople of Samoan descent
St. George Illawarra Dragons players
Wests Tigers players
North Queensland Cowboys players
Rugby league locks
Rugby league second-rows
People educated at Endeavour Sports High School
Rugby league players from New South Wales